All The Good is an Irish-bred Thoroughbred racehorse who won the 2008 Australian Group 1 MRC Caulfield Cup over 2400 metres. He was ridden by Kerrin McEvoy and trained by Saeed bin Suroor for the Godolphin Racing stable. He had previously won the Totesport Newburgh, a substitute race for the 2008 Ebor Handicap.

Pedigree

References

External links
 All The Good pedigree

2003 racehorse births
Caulfield Cup winners
Racehorses bred in Ireland
Racehorses trained in the United Kingdom
Racehorses trained in the United Arab Emirates
Thoroughbred family 2-i